Gavin Hadley is a current Hong Kong Rugby Union player. He plays for the Hong Kong Football Club and the Hong Kong National Team. Hadley has also played for the Hong Kong A team. He was named in the  squad to the 2015 Asian Rugby Championship.

Hadley was part of the historic  squad that toured Europe in 2009.

References

Living people
Hong Kong international rugby union players
Hong Kong rugby union players
Year of birth missing (living people)